Crosland Moor Airfield  is a small privately owned airfield located  south-west of Huddersfield, West Yorkshire, in England. The airfield was established by Sir David Brown who owned a local business and flew a de Havilland Dove, registration G-ARDH. It is now run by former professional motorcycle road racer James Whitham.

Technical information 
There is a 2.6% slope down runway 07 from the start of the asphalt.
 Elevation: 
Radio frequency: Huddersfield Radio 128.375 MHz

Incidents
6 December 2008 – Piper Cherokee aborts take-off after failing to reach required airspeed due to the pilot inadvertently leaving the carburettor heat on and overruns the runway. One person suffers minor injuries and the aircraft is significantly damaged.
May 1988 – Microlight crashes after misjudging landing when there was a sudden change of wind direction. It landed in a field near the runway, killing the pilot.

Media appearances
The airfield appeared in the Amazon Prime video show The Grand Tour in series 2, episode 9, when a jet engine was tested as part of a successful attempt to break the UK speed record for amphibious vehicles.

Gallery

References

External links 

Official site

Airports in England
Geography of Huddersfield
Transport in West Yorkshire
Kirklees
Colne Valley
Airports in Yorkshire